PcrA, standing for plasmid copy reduced is a helicase that was originally discovered in a screen for chromosomally encoded genes that are affected in plasmid rolling circle replication in the Gram-positive pathogen Staphylococcus aureus.

Biological functions 
Genetic and biochemical studies have shown that the helicase is essential for plasmid rolling-circle replication and repair of DNA damage caused by exposure to ultraviolet radiation. It catalyzes the unwinding of double-stranded plasmid DNA that has been nicked at the replication origin by the replication initiation protein. Genetic and biochemical studies have also shown that the helicase plays an important role in cell-survival by regulating the levels of RecA-mediated recombination in Gram-positive bacteria.

Biochemical properties 
The helicase is a monomeric translocase and utilizes ATP to unwind DNA. The preferred substrates are single-stranded DNA containing 3' overhangs. The processivity of PcrA is increased in the presence of plasmid replication initiation protein.

Crystal Structure 
The structure of the helicase has been solved at high resolution and indicates "inchworming" as the mechanism of translocation on single-stranded DNA. A Mexican-wave model has been proposed based on the changes in conformation of the helicase observed in the product versus substrate complex.

Classification 
PcrA belongs to the SF1 superfamily of helicases, which also include the E. coli helicases UvrD and Rep and the eukaryotic helicase Srs2.

Literature

External links

Enzymes
DNA replication
DNA repair